Peter Wayne Gladigau (born 23 May 1965) is a former cricketer who played first-class and List A cricket for South Australia from 1985-86 to 1992-93.

Peter Gladigau was an opening bowler. In his best season, 1987-88, he was one of the leading bowlers in the Sheffield Shield, taking 38 wickets at an average of 29.05, including his best career figures of 7 for 85 against Victoria.

He works as a police officer in Adelaide. He represented Glenelg in the Adelaide cricket competition. He was awarded life membership of the club and is now its Cricket Operations Manager.

References

External links

Peter Gladigau at CricketArchive

1965 births
Living people
Australian cricketers
South Australia cricketers
People from Whyalla